The Large Luzon Forest Rat, or Luzon Forest Rat (Bullimus luzonicus) is a species of rodent, the first of three to be described in the genus Bullimus. It is in the diverse family Muridae. It is found only in the Philippines. The rat has been recorded in Aurora, Benguet, and Camarines Sur provinces, and in Balbalasang, Kalinga province.

References

Bullimus
Rats of Asia
Endemic fauna of the Philippines
Fauna of Luzon
Rodents of the Philippines
Mammals described in 1895
Taxa named by Oldfield Thomas
Taxonomy articles created by Polbot